Alexander Skinner Jackson (12 May 1905 – 15 November 1946) was a Scottish footballer who played for clubs including Dumbarton, Bethlehem Steel, Aberdeen, Huddersfield Town, Chelsea and Nice; he won the English Football League title with Huddersfield in 1925–26. Jackson received 17 international caps for Scotland over a five-year period, and was a member of the 1928 team that became known as the 'Wembley Wizards' after defeating England 5–1 in London, scoring three of those goals.

Football career

Club
Jackson was born and raised in Renton. A highly talented outside right, known as the Gay Cavalier, he was particularly adept at dribbling and free kicks. He initially played for Renton Victoria but was transferred to Dumbarton in 1922 for the pre-inflation price of a football. In 1923, he left Scotland to play in the American Soccer League with Bethlehem Steel alongside his elder brother Wattie, before both returned to Scotland to play for Aberdeen.

After an impressive debut season for the Dons he joined English side Huddersfield Town, then the reigning League Champions, for a record £5000. Jackson helped Huddersfield retain their league title in 1925–26 and the runners-up spot in the following two years. He also led them to two FA Cup Finals: he scored in the 1928 final against Blackburn Rovers, but it was not enough to prevent a 3–1 loss. In 1930 he was again on the losing side, this time against Arsenal.

Jackson signed for David Calderhead's big-spending Chelsea in September 1930 for £8,500, joining international teammates Hughie Gallacher, Tommy Law and Alec Cheyne already at the club. His time at Chelsea was hampered by injuries, though he linked up well with the prolific Gallacher and himself scored 31 goals from 78 games for the club. Jackson's first-class career was then ended prematurely during the 1932–33 season. Having already fallen foul of the Chelsea hierarchy for activities relating to the public house he operated, he and several other star players at the club were approached by French side Nîmes with a lucrative contract offer, which Jackson threatened to accept unless Chelsea broke their maximum wage structure and increased his salary. The club refused to budge and, in the days before the Bosman ruling, Jackson could do little. He was forced to finish his career playing for a series of non-league clubs such as Ashton National (from Ashton-under-Lyne) and Margate. He later joined French side Nice.

International
It was Jackson's career with the Scottish national team for which he is now perhaps best remembered. He won his first cap at the age of 19 and scored the winning goal against England to clinch the 1925–26 British Home Championship. He was one of the Wembley Wizards, the name given to the Scotland side which beat England 5–1 at Wembley in March 1928; Jackson scored a hat-trick during the match. He stated that his most "glorious" match for Scotland was eleven months later, when he scored two of his side's goals in a 7–3 victory over a capable Ireland team in Belfast. His international career was later hindered by a ban on Anglos (Scots who played for English clubs) as a result of a dispute between the SFA and FA, and he finished with 17 caps and eight goals, only finishing on the losing side once.

Career statistics

International
Scores and results list Scotland's goal tally first.

Other interests
Jackson was the landlord of a public house in London's Covent Garden while playing with Chelsea, and also had a weekly newspaper column. After retiring from international football he owned greyhounds at Wandsworth Stadium. He was enthusiastic about the stadium after it was built in 1933 and his first greyhound was called Jovial Honey. He also urged the management to consider the possibility of using the stadium as a football field inside the greyhound track.

He was killed in a traffic collision whilst serving with the army, as a major in the Pioneer Corps in Egypt in 1946 aged 40. He is buried at the Fayid War Cemetery.

See also
 List of Scotland national football team hat-tricks

References

External links 

 

1905 births
1946 deaths
Aberdeen F.C. players
American Soccer League (1921–1933) players
Association football outside forwards
Bethlehem Steel F.C. (1907–1930) players
British Army personnel of World War II
Chelsea F.C. players
Dumbarton F.C. players
Huddersfield Town A.F.C. players
Footballers from West Dunbartonshire
Road incident deaths in Egypt
Scottish expatriate footballers
Scottish expatriate sportspeople in France
Scottish expatriate sportspeople in the United States
Scottish footballers
Scotland international footballers
English Football League players
People in greyhound racing
People educated at Dumbarton Academy
Expatriate soccer players in the United States
FA Cup Final players
People from Renton, West Dunbartonshire
20th-century Scottish people